Tatung Institute of Technology (TTC) is an educational institution based in East District, Chiayi City, Taiwan. It has five new departments: Finance, Food and Beverage Management, Early Childhood Care and Education, Multimedia Design, and Leisure Recreation and Tourism Management, with a total of ten academic departments.

History
The school was officially founded as Tatung Junior College of Commerce in 1963 and upgraded as Tatung Institute of Technology in 2003. A two-year Continuing Education Junior College was established in 1999, and four years later another campus was built in Taibau. In 2020, the university had an enrollment rate of less than 60%.

Tea Culture and Department of Business Management
The Tea Culture and Department of Business Management (茶文化與事業經營學位學程 (系)) has curriculum tailored to specialize in the study of the tea industry like Tea Production and Processing, Market Prospection and Marketing, Tea Culture, and Tourism Management.

The department was founded in 2011. Courses are taught in Chinese with a global perspective and the teaching of English tea terminology. The college provides education in tea science and cultivation, tea arts and culture, tea drinking promotion, as well as preparing people in the field of tea marketing. It is the first college in Taiwan to have specialized curriculum in tea studies.

Professional fields of study

 Tea production and processing technology
 Marketing and market development
 Tea culture
 Tourism management

See also
 List of universities in Taiwan

References

External links

Liberty Times (Chinese)
Taiwan Ministry of Education, (item-86)

1963 establishments in Taiwan
Chinese tea ceremony schools
East District, Chiayi
Educational institutions established in 1963
Universities and colleges in Chiayi
Universities and colleges in Taiwan
Technical universities and colleges in Taiwan